is a 1991 platform game developed by Sonic Team and published by Sega for the Sega Genesis/Mega Drive. The first game in the Sonic the Hedgehog franchise, it was released in North America on June 23 and in PAL regions and Japan the following month. Players control Sonic the Hedgehog, who can run at supersonic speeds; Sonic sets out on a quest to defeat Dr. Robotnik, a scientist who has imprisoned animals in robots and seeks the powerful Chaos Emeralds. The gameplay involves collecting rings as a form of health, and a simple control scheme, with jumping and attacking controlled by a single button.

Development began in 1990 when Sega ordered its developers to create a game featuring a mascot for the company. The developers chose a blue hedgehog designed by Naoto Oshima after he won an internal character design contest, and named themselves Sonic Team to match their character. It uses a novel technique that allows Sonic's sprite to roll along curved scenery which was based on a concept by Oshima from 1989. Sonic the Hedgehog, designed for fast gameplay, was influenced by games by Super Mario series creator Shigeru Miyamoto. The music was composed by Masato Nakamura, bassist of the J-pop band Dreams Come True.

Sonic the Hedgehog was well received by critics, who praised its visuals, audio, and gameplay. It is widely considered one of the greatest video games of all time. It was also commercially successful, becoming one of the best-selling video games of all time with approximately  copies sold worldwide across all platforms; it established the Genesis as a key player in the 16-bit era and allowing it to compete with the Super Nintendo Entertainment System. It has been ported a number of times, and inspired several clones, a successful franchise, and adaptations into other media. It was followed by Sonic the Hedgehog 2 in 1992.

Gameplay

Sonic the Hedgehog is a 2D side-scrolling platform game. The gameplay centers on Sonic the Hedgehog's ability to run at high speed through levels that include springs, slopes, bottomless pits, and vertical loops. The levels are populated with robot enemies, inside which Dr. Robotnik has trapped animals; destroying a robot frees the animal, but is not necessary to complete the game. The player must also avoid touching spikes, falling into bottomless pits, being crushed by moving walls or platforms, and drowning, which may be prevented by breathing air bubbles from vents. Sonic's main means of attack is the spin attack, in which he curls into a ball and spins his body, damaging enemies and certain obstacles upon collision. This may be performed by jumping or rolling.

At the start of the game, the player is given three lives, which may be lost if Sonic collides with hazardous enemies or objects while in possession of no rings, falls to the bottom of the level screen, or exceeds an act's ten-minute time limit. Signposts act as checkpoints to allow Sonic to return to the most recently activated post when he loses a life. The time resets when he returns to the checkpoint. The game ends when the player runs out of lives, although the player may return to the beginning of the act with three lives if they have any continues.

Scattered around each level are gold rings. Collecting 100 rings rewards the player with an extra life. Rings act as a layer of protection against hazards: if Sonic holds at least one ring when he collides with an enemy or dangerous obstacle, all his rings will scatter. He can recollect some of them again before they disappear. If he is hit without holding any rings, he loses a life. Shields and temporary invincibility can be collected to provide additional layers of protection, but certain hazards, such as drowning, being crushed, falling into bottomless pits, or running out of time, kill Sonic regardless of rings or other protection.

The game is split into six principal zones, followed by a short Final Zone. Each main zone has its own visual style, and while some enemies appear throughout, each zone has unique enemies and obstacles. Each main zone is split into three acts, all of which must be completed. At the end of each main zone's third act, the player confronts Dr. Robotnik for a boss fight. For most of the fights, Robotnik's vehicle is fitted with different weapons. After completing the sixth zone, the player continues to the single-level Final Zone for a last encounter with Robotnik inside a large machine environment. Destroying Robotnik's machine ends the game. A brief animation shows Sonic's return to the first zone, with animals liberated from Dr. Robotnik.

If Sonic reaches the end of any zone's Act 1 or Act 2 while holding at least 50 rings, a large ring appears through which he can jump to enter a "special stage". In the Special Stages, Sonic is continually curled up in his Spin Attack animation, and bounces off the bumpers and walls of a fully rotating maze. In these levels, the player earns a number of continues for each multiple of 50 rings collected, but the main goal is to obtain the Chaos Emerald hidden within the maze. Colliding with any of the blocks marked "GOAL" ends the level.

Plot
In an attempt to steal the six Chaos Emeralds and harness their power, the evil Dr. Ivo Robotnik has trapped the animal inhabitants of South Island inside aggressive robots and stationary metal capsules. The player controls Sonic, who aims to halt Robotnik's plans by freeing his animal friends and collecting the emeralds himself. If the player collects all the Chaos Emeralds and completes the game, an ending sequence is shown. If all the emeralds are not collected, Robotnik taunts the player while juggling any of the Chaos Emeralds not collected by the player.

Development

Background and character design
In the 1980s, Sega had limited success with Genesis ports of its arcade games, but wanted a stronger foothold against its main competitor, Nintendo. In 1988, Sega of Japan began an in-house competition to create a rival to Nintendo's mascot Mario. For the next three years, programmers and designers at Sega worked on a brand character to rival Mario. In 1990, Sega ordered its in-house development studio to develop a game featuring a mascot for the company. Sega's president Hayao Nakayama wanted a character as iconic as Mickey Mouse.

The team developed ideas for characters, an engine, and gameplay mechanics. Development emphasized speed, so Sega considered fast creatures such as kangaroos and squirrels and eliminated  designs not associated with fast animals. One idea, a rabbit able to grasp objects with prehensile ears, showed promise but was too complex for the Genesis hardware. The team narrowed its search to animals that could roll into a ball, their idea for an attacking move, and considered armadillos and hedgehogs. The hedgehog character, proposed by Naoto Ohshima, prevailed. Ohshima went on vacation to New York, taking sketches with him. He went to Central Park and asked locals for their opinions on them, and Sonic was the favorite. A man with a moustache, who eventually became Dr. Robotnik, was in second place.

Sonic was originally teal-colored, then a light shade of blue, but he was changed to dark blue so he would stand out against certain backgrounds and to match the Sega logo. According to Ohshima, Sonic's basic design was created by combining Felix the Cat's head with Mickey Mouse's body. His shoes had buckles through the inspiration of Michael Jackson's boots on the album cover for Bad and the red and white color scheme of Santa Claus, whom Ohshima saw as the most "famous character in the world". Sonic's spikes were emphasized to make him sleeker, and he was given the ability to spin while jumping (so attacking and jumping could be controlled with one button). The new character was originally named "Mr. Hedgehog", but the eight-member team changed his name to "Sonic" and took the name Sonic Team. 

Ohshima said that "Sonic" was chosen because it represented speed. Ideas proposed to flesh out the character included placing him in a rock band, giving him vampire fangs, and giving him a human girlfriend named Madonna. Sega of America scrapped these ideas to keep his identity simple. Sega of America also expressed concerns that most Americans would not know what a hedgehog is. According to Mark Cerny, who worked in Tokyo as an intermediary between the Japanese and American Sega offices, the American staff felt the character was "unsalvageable". They made plans to educate Sonic Team on character design with the work of Will Vinton, the creator of the California Raisins. They proposed a full-scale recreation of the character, but compromised with Sonic Team to simply make design changes for western audiences. The antagonist was named "Dr. Eggman" in Japan and "Dr. Robotnik" in other regions as a result of a dispute between Sega's American and Japanese divisions.

Concept and programming
With a satisfying protagonist established, Sega turned to the programmer Yuji Naka, who had impressed them with his work on Phantasy Star and the Genesis port of Ghouls 'n Ghosts. Naka was a fan of Super Mario Bros. but wanted something faster, so the game was made to play quickly, which was where he focused most of his effort. Naka explained that the reason he wanted a fast game was that he had ported Ghouls 'n Ghosts, and wanted to work on its movement but found it slow.

Sonic the Hedgehog was developed by a team of seven: two programmers, two sound engineers, and three designers, although it began with just Ohshima and Naka. People came onto the team as the need for content increased. After being assigned a project with the code name "Defeat Mario", Ohshima and Naka began work, but encountered problems: Ohshima's Rabbit proved hard to program. Catching items and throwing them caused the action's rhythm to break. Naka stated that the rabbit was not suitable for his game engine, and he also wanted the game to be playable with only one button. Hirokazu Yasuhara came onto the team to supervise Ohshima and Naka and develop levels. He became the lead designer due to his greater experience, and found the way to make the game playable with only one button by having Sonic do damage by jumping. The trio came up with the idea of him rolling into a ball. After the hedgehog character was chosen, many characters were redrawn, and the team agreed on the environments' visual complexity, with particular focus on the colors. After this, four people came onto the team to speed development up.

Due to the popularity of Mario, Naka wanted Sonic to take over the American market. Sonic's default speed was set to that of Mario while running. Tests were run using the Genesis' tool library, and problems such as flickering, slow frame rates, and shaky animation soon became apparent. Increasing Sonic's speed caused animation problems. Naka solved this by developing an algorithm retained fluidity. All that was left was to optimize of the game speed to adhere to the staff's expectations. The team noticed that different people had different perceptions of the game's speed: some believed it was too fast, which caused disagreements. As a result, it was slowed down.

The loop running was implemented in a tech demo by Naka, who developed an algorithm allowing a sprite to move smoothly on a curve by determining its position with a dot matrix. Naka's prototype was a platform game with a fast-moving character rolling in a ball through a long, winding tube, and this concept was fleshed out with Ohshima's character designs and levels by Yasuhara. Yasuhara originally intended to work on the game for three months due to the delay of his planned move to the United States by the outbreak of the Gulf War, but was engrossed in the project for nearly a year. His designs for levels were intended to attract both hardcore and casual gamers by integrating occasional challenging set pieces into the mostly accessible level design. The color scheme was influenced by the work of pop artist Eizin Suzuki, and the aesthetics of Green Hill were influenced by the geography of California.

In designing the gameplay, Naka was inspired by Mario creator Shigeru Miyamoto, whose games he had enjoyed playing years earlier. Admiring the simplicity of Miyamoto's mechanics in complex environments, Naka decided that Sonic would be controlled with only a directional pad for movement and a single button for jumping. He also wanted his creation to be more action-oriented than the Mario series; while playing Super Mario Bros., he had wondered why the levels could not be cleared more quickly.

Ohshima, Naka, and Yasuhara worked 19 hours a day on the project for several months. Due to the need to demonstrate the Genesis' technological prowess, the game underwent extensive testing and redesign, which took over six months. According to Naka, the game had the fastest-ever character speed in a video game and a rotation effect in the special stages that had been considered impossible on the console.

The team intended to add a two-player mode displayed via split-screen, but Naka's programming knowledge was insufficient to implement it. A two-player mode appeared in Sonic the Hedgehog 2 (1992), whereby the second player controls Sonic's sidekick Miles "Tails" Prower. Sonic Team also intended to include a sound test with animations of Sonic breakdancing to a band of animal characters; including a crocodile keyboardist who was later introduced into the series as Vector the Crocodile in Knuckles' Chaotix in 1995. The sound test was scrapped for time reasons and Naka used the freed up memory to add the "Se-ga!" chant used in TV commercials as a startup sound.

Naka's relationship with Sega was tenuous during this time, and he received little credit for his work. He left the company shortly after the game's release, although Sega of America hired him later. Before leaving, however, he defied Sega's prohibition of developer credits by displaying a few names in black text on a black background, identifiable only by looking at the code. Naka stated that level design was a major challenge: he created maps much wider than normal and tried to ensure players would not get lost. It took him around eight months to develop Green Hill Zone as he kept restarting from scratch. He stated that he found the process "very interesting". Naka also stated that the team was trying to create smooth maps, and that implementing looping structures was a challenge because Sonic would break through them instead of running around them. The backgrounds were also a challenge, as the game's speed created the impression of going backwards. The zones were based on designs by Naka and Ohshima, with the goal of creating the world's fastest action game. According to Ohshima, Robotnik was based on Humpty Dumpty.

Yasuhara wanted the game to appeal to both Japanese and American players, which was why Green Hill Zone was redesigned many times. Sonic Team wanted the level to portray the character correctly. Its checkered ground was inspired by 3D image rendering from computers, an idea Naka obtained from Sega developer Yu Suzuki, who used this technique with Space Harrier. The team read Famitsu to stay informed of what their rivals were doing so they could avoid their mistakes.

Music

Sega director Fujio Minegishi had connections to the music industry, and suggested his friend Yūzō Kayama write the Sonic score. However, Sonic Team did not think Kayama's music would fit, and so commissioned Masato Nakamura, bassist and songwriter of the J-pop band Dreams Come True. Nakamura said he was surprised, as he had just started with Dreams Come True, but accepted as he was inspired by the team's desire to outperform Nintendo. He said the hardest part was working with the limited number of sounds that could play concurrently: he was limited to four, and said that his lack of knowledge of music on computers made it "impossible". He wrote the soundtrack concurrently with the Dreams Come True album Million Kisses. After he finished the compositions, they were digitized using an Atari ST and the program Notator.

On October 19, 2011, over 20 years after the release, a three-disc compilation of music from Sonic the Hedgehog and Sonic the Hedgehog 2 was released in Japan. The first disc features original tracks from both games, the second contains Nakamura's demo recordings before they were programmed into the Genesis, and the third has songs by Dreams Come True and their associated Akon remixes.

Packaging and release
Game-package illustrator Akira Watanabe said that his goal was to make the characters "colorful", using clear lines and gradation to "finish them neatly". According to Watanabe, the developers asked him to create a package design "similar to pop art ... without being particular to conventional packages" – something "original" and "stylish". The game was not revealed until the January 1991 International Consumer Electronics Show because Sega wanted to wait until the right time and because they saw an opportunity to "steal the show". At the show, Sonic the Hedgehog was believed to be the most impressive game shown, and won the CES award for innovation.

Sega of America CEO Tom Kalinske wanted reassurance that the character would not fail. The global head of marketing, Al Nilsen, became involved, and playtested the game across the United States with Mario fans: they were shown Mario and then played Sonic the Hedgehog. 80 percent preferred Sonic the Hedgehog, and the game was shown at the 1991 Summer Consumer Electronics Show. It was widely released in North America on June 23, 1991, and in the PAL regions and Japan the following month. In November 1991, Sega of America packaged it with American Genesis consoles, replacing Altered Beast. This tactic enabled Sega of America to sell 15 million Genesis units. Genesis owners who bought their consoles before the switch could request free copies of Sonic the Hedgehog by mail. Sega of America created a marketing campaign, making Sonic its new mascot.

Other versions and rereleases

8-bit version

A version of Sonic the Hedgehog was developed by Ancient and released in late 1991 for Sega's 8-bit consoles, the Master System and Game Gear. Its plot and gameplay mechanics are similar to the 16-bit version, though some level themes and digital assets are different and Chaos Emeralds are scattered throughout levels rather than special stages. Gameplay as a whole is simplified; the level design is flatter and has a larger focus on exploration, with no vertical loops, and Sonic cannot re-collect his rings after being hit. The game has a different soundtrack composed by Yuzo Koshiro, which includes adaptations of music from the original version. It was the final game released for the Master System in North America. The Master System version was re-released for Wii's Virtual Console service in North America and Europe in August 2008. The Game Gear version was re-released for the Nintendo 3DS Virtual Console on June 13, 2013, and included as an unlockable game in Sonic Adventure DX: Director's Cut for GameCube and Windows and Sonic Mega Collection Plus for PlayStation 2, Xbox, and Windows.

Sonic the Hedgehog Genesis
To mark the game's fifteenth anniversary, a port for the Game Boy Advance, Sonic the Hedgehog Genesis, was released on November 14, 2006. While the port is mostly identical to the original, it includes several new features not seen in the original Genesis release, such as the ability to save game progress and the inclusion of the Spin Dash move. This version, unlike others, received poor reviews, with a Metacritic score of 33/100. The chief complaints concerned its poor conversion to the Game Boy Advance, resulting in a bad performance and poor implementation of the original music and gameplay.

As a response to the poor reception and claims that the system could not handle the original game, Simon "Stealth" Thomley, who later assisted with the development of the 2013 mobile port, released an unofficial, proof-of-concept version of Sonic the Hedgehog for the system. The unofficial version contains a complete Green Hill Zone and two special stages, as well as Tails and Knuckles as playable characters.

2013 remaster
A remastered mobile port was released on iOS on May 15, 2013, with an Android version following the next day. This version was developed by Christian "Taxman" Whitehead and Simon Thomley of Headcannon from scratch using the Retro Engine, previously used in the 2011 remaster of Sonic CD. This port features several enhancements, such as widescreen graphics, the optional ability to Spin Dash, an additional special stage, a time attack mode, and the unlockable option to play as Tails or Knuckles; it additionally features a heavily expanded debug mode which allows for use of unused elements and elements from more recent games (such as the characters' super forms). The iOS version was updated in 2016, adding compatibility with Apple TV.

3D Sonic the Hedgehog
A Nintendo 3DS version, 3D Sonic the Hedgehog, was released as part of the 3D Classics line in 2013. This version, unlike most downloadable re-releases of the game, is not emulated; rather, the code was restructured to take advantage of the 3DS system's stereoscopic 3D graphics and comes with additional enhancements, such as the option to use the Spin Dash move, a CRT-style filter, and the option to start from any level.

Compilation releases

With its sequels for the Genesis, Sonic the Hedgehog has been ported for a wide range of home and handheld consoles and personal computers through compilations. The first collection it appeared in was Sonic Compilation (1995) for the Genesis. It has since appeared in Sonic Jam (1997) for the Saturn, Sonic Mega Collection (2002) for the GameCube, Sonic Mega Collection Plus (2004) for the PlayStation 2 and Xbox, Sega Genesis Collection for the PlayStation 2 and PSP, Sonic's Ultimate Genesis Collection (2009) for the Xbox 360 and PlayStation 3, Sonic Classic Collection (2010) for the Nintendo DS, Oculus Arcade for the Oculus Rift, and Sega Genesis Classics (2018) for Microsoft Windows, PlayStation 4, Xbox One and Nintendo Switch. The 2013 remaster was included in the 2022 compilation Sonic Origins.

Downloadable releases
Sonic the Hedgehog has been available for all three major seventh-generation video game consoles. It was part of the Wii Virtual Console at the service's 2006 introduction, and was released for the Xbox Live Arcade and PlayStation Network shortly afterwards. The game was released for the iPod Classic, iPod video, and video-capable iPod Nano models in 2007 and for Apple's iOS in April 2009. Sonic the Hedgehog became available on GameTap in September 2009. In October 2010, it was released on Windows via Steam. The game was ported to Android and released in December 2012. Additionally, it is an unlockable reward in the console versions of Sonic Generations. The 2013 remaster was made available on the Sega Forever service on iOS and Android in June 2017. A port for Nintendo Switch was released on September 20, 2018 as part of the Sega Ages line of rereleases. It adds features including the ability to use moves from Sonic 2 and Sonic Mania, a challenge mode, a time attack for the first stage, and features from the 3DS rereleases of the game and its sequel.

Canceled versions
U.S. Gold acquired the rights to make a version of Sonic the Hedgehog for the Amiga, ZX Spectrum, Commodore 64, Amstrad CPC and Atari ST personal computers, but these went unreleased. Several screenshots exist, some of which resemble the 8-bit version. An enhanced port for the Sega CD was also planned, but was canceled in favor of Sonic CD.

Reception

Sales
Sonic the Hedgehog was a commercial success. It became America's best-selling video game for several months in 1991, outselling Super Mario. By Christmas 1991, Sonic the Hedgehog had sold nearly  game cartridges in the United States. It was also Blockbuster Video's highest-renting game of the year. In the United Kingdom, it was the top-selling Mega Drive game for two months following its release.

Sonic the Hedgehog was the best-selling home video game of 1991, with  copies sold worldwide by the end of the year, becoming Sega's best-selling home video game up until then. Sonic the Hedgehog set a Sega software sales record with  cartridges sold by March 1992, including  copies in the United States and another  in Europe and Japan. The game went on to sell  units by October 1992, and  copies worldwide by November 1992.

The original version bundled with the Sega Genesis/Mega Drive hardware had sold over 15 million copies, . The mobile game version also had eight million paid downloads by 2008, 482,960 units were sold on Xbox Live Arcade , and over 500,000 paid Android downloads were sold between 2013 and 2016, bringing total sales to approximately  copies sold worldwide across all platforms.

Contemporary reviews
Sonic the Hedgehog was praised by critics, with scores above 90% from most video game magazines at the time. It was considered Sega's answer to Nintendo's widely popular Mario series, as it was a platformer featuring the company's mascot. In a preview following its CES debut in January 1991, John Cook of Computer and Video Games called it the most impressive game at the show and said it was "another jumpy jumpy game in the Mario mould, but with an astonishing turn of speed and great music." Upon release, Paul Rand of Computer and Video Games compared the two in depth and characterized Sonic the Hedgehog as being faster, with brighter colors, and Super Mario World as having more "depth of play". Frank Ladoire of  believed Sonic the Hedgehog was part of a new generation of games that demonstrate that the Mega Drive is capable of "beautiful things" in the technical department.

Reviewers praised the colorful, detailed graphics. Rand called its color scheme "lively, but never garish", praising the interaction of color with detail in the sprites, backgrounds, and animations and describing its graphics as the best available for the Mega Drive. Reviewer Boogie Man of GamePro called the intricate backgrounds "eye-popping" and "gorgeous", which was echoed by Mean Machines. The Lessers (Hartley, Patricia, and Kirk) of Dragon claimed the graphics made Sonic a possible contender for the best game of 1991 and GameZone called the animation "some of the smoothest and fastest ... ever seen". Julian Boardman of Raze praised the "colourful and highly detailed" backdrops and "fabulous" sprites. The music and sound effects were also well received; Dragon called them "great", and GameZone "amazing". Rand praised the "catchy" soundtrack, calling some of the sound effects "absolutely brilliant". Although Mean Machines called the songs "vaguely appealing", the sound effects were better appreciated. However, Boardman of Raze considered the music "a little boring".

Critics cited the fast gameplay, unprecedented in platformers. The difficulty was disputed, described as "impossible" by Rand and "average" by EGM. Rand said about the gameplay in general that it "plays like a dream"; according to GameZone it would enchant players for hours, and Boogie Man praised Sonic Team's ability to provide an engaging experience primarily from running and jumping. Although EGM, Dragon, Paul of Mean Machines and Boardman of Raze praised the level design (especially the hidden rooms), Paul found losing all of one's rings frustrating.

Bob Strauss of Entertainment Weekly gave the game an A+ and wrote that it was a very fast game, yet never felt chaotic or impossible, and they later named it the best game available in 1991.

Awards
At the 1991 Golden Joystick Awards, Sonic the Hedgehog won Overall Game of the Year. In the 1991 Electronic Gaming Monthly awards, Sonic the Hedgehog won Game of the Year. At the European Computer Trade Show (ECTS) awards, it won the awards for Best Video Game and Going Live Viewers Award. In 1992, Mega ranked Sonic as their third-favorite Genesis game. In 1995, Flux magazine rated the game 4th in its "Top 100 Video Games." In 1996, GamesMaster ranked the game 78th on their "Top 100 Games of All Time." In 2016, The Strong National Museum of Play inducted Sonic the Hedgehog to its World Video Game Hall of Fame.

Retrospective reviews

Retrospective reception has been positive, with an 86% rating at the review aggregator GameRankings based on nine reviews published online in the 2000s. Sonic the Hedgehog has maintained its popularity, and has since been considered one of the greatest video games of all time.

Frank Provo of GameSpot described the game as "one of the best platformers of all time", finding that despite technical issues in the Game Boy Advance port "after all these years, the underlying graphics, audio, and gameplay still hold up". Lucas M. Thomas of IGN agreed that it stood the test of time. Writing in The Guardian, Keith Stuart observed that Sonic the Hedgehogs emphasis on speed and pinball mechanics dramatically departs from generally accepted precepts of game design, requiring that players "learn through repetition rather than observation" as "the levels aren't designed to be seen or even understood in one playthrough." However, Stuart concluded that "sometimes in Sonic, when you get better, or through sheer luck, things take off, every jump is right, every loop-the-loop is perfect, and you're in the flow, sailing above the game's strange structure ... Sonic is incorrect game design and yet ... it's a masterpiece."

Legacy 

Primarily because of its Genesis bundling, Sonic the Hedgehog was a factor in popularising the console in North America, thus solidifying it as a competitor to Nintendo and their Super Nintendo Entertainment System. During October–December 1991 with the game's success, the Genesis outsold the SNES by two to one; at its January 1992 peak it gained a foothold in the industry and had 65 percent of the market for 16-bit consoles. Although Nintendo eventually overtook Sega, it was the first time since December 1985 that Nintendo did not lead the console market.

Sonic the Hedgehog inspired similar platformers starring animal mascots, including Bubsy, Aero the Acro-Bat, James Pond 3, Earthworm Jim, Zero the Kamikaze Squirrel, and Radical Rex. "Animal with attitude" games carried over to the next generation of consoles, with the developers of Crash Bandicoot and Gex citing Sonic as a major inspiration.

Sonic's success led to an extensive media franchise, with the first of many sequels, Sonic the Hedgehog 2, released the following year. It has generated dozens of additional games and a large cast of recurring characters, keeping Sonic and Robotnik (later renamed as Eggman) mainstays, and continued beyond Sega's exit from the console industry after the Dreamcast. The series has ventured from platformers to fighting, racing, role-playing, and sports games, and also expanded into anime, manga, cartoons comic books, novels, and toys. Sonic the Hedgehog is one of the best-selling video game franchises of all time, with over 140 million copies sold or downloaded worldwide across consoles, PC's, mobile phones and tablets by May 2014. The game's first level, Green Hill Zone, has been featured in later games such as Sonic Adventure 2, Sonic Generations, Sonic Mania, Sonic Forces, and the Super Smash Bros. series.

The game inspired a number of unofficial variants, including Somari, a pirated Nintendo Entertainment System conversion featuring Nintendo's Mario character in levels from the original Sonic game, Sonic the Hedgehog Megamix, a total conversion mod of the original game, and Sonic 1 Boomed, a ROM hack which implements Sonic's redesign from the Sonic Boom animated series.

Notes

References

Sources

External links 
 Official website

1991 video games
Android (operating system) games
Game Boy Advance games
IOS games
IPod games
Nintendo 3DS eShop games
Pack-in video games
Platform games
PlayStation Network games
Sega Genesis games
Side-scrolling platform games
Sonic Team games
Sonic the Hedgehog video games
Tiger Electronics handheld games
Video games scored by Masato Nakamura
Video games set on fictional islands
Video games developed in Japan
Virtual Console games
Windows games
Xbox 360 Live Arcade games
Single-player video games
Golden Joystick Award for Game of the Year winners
World Video Game Hall of Fame
Video games with title protagonists